Andres Sööt (born 4 February 1934 in Paide) is an Estonian film director and operator.

In 1963 he graduated from Gerasimov Institute of Cinematography.

In 1997 he was awarded with Order of the National Coat of Arms, V class.

Filmography

 1970 Elavad mustrid (documentary film; director)  
 1978 "Arvo Pärt novembris 1978" (documentary film; director and operator)
 1997 "Elasime Eestile" ('We Lived for Estonia') (documentary film; director)

References

Living people
1934 births
Estonian film directors
People from Paide